Nikolai Ivanovich Karpov (November 8, 1929 in Moscow, Soviet Union – November 7, 2013 in Moscow, Russia) was a Soviet ice hockey player who played for the Soviet national team. He won a bronze medal at the 1960 Winter Olympics.

References

External links
 

1929 births
2013 deaths
Ice hockey people from Moscow
Ice hockey players at the 1960 Winter Olympics
Medalists at the 1960 Winter Olympics
Olympic bronze medalists for the Soviet Union
Olympic ice hockey players of the Soviet Union
Olympic medalists in ice hockey